Mars Hill Bible School is a private, college preparatory Christian day school for boys and girls located in Florence, Alabama. The school begins at pre-kindergarten and continues through the twelfth grade.
The school also operates a pre-school on four campuses in the area and has an enrollment of over 300.

History

Mars Hill Academy, the first predecessor of today's school was opened by Theophilus Brown Larimore in 1871. He drew the name "Mars Hill" from the New Testament book of Acts (17:22) Then Paul stood in the midst of Mars' hill...  He later changed the name to Mars Hill College. The academy and college operated for 16 years teaching hundreds of young men. Larimore offered a diverse curriculum of classes including business writing, rhetoric and Latin as well as advanced studies in the Bible.  from his students came many preachers that established numerous congregations around the area.  The college was closed in 1887 in order for Larimore to spend more time preaching.

Mars Hill Bible School was reopened in 1947 through a collaboration among local churches of Christ Charlie Morris being the head of the reinstitution of the school on the original campus of Larimore's Mars Hill Academy. The Larimore Home was used as the main building of the school with classes being taught in the 12 rooms of the historic house.  A high school building was later built and a few years later a new elementary building was constructed.

Academics
MHBS has been awarded the "Excellence in Education Award" on 3 separate occasions.  In 2016 the school received an overall score of 306.15 from AdvancED which is a national school accreditation agency.  Their score was above the agency's network average of 278.34  The Honors Diploma, one of 4 offered diplomas, requires 28 credits that include Bible, English, Social Studies, Humanities, Science, Mathematics, Computer Science, Foreign Language, Health and Physical Education.  To receive this diploma, students must maintain a 90.0 or higher cumulative average.

The Dual-Enrollment program in partnership with Northwest-Shoals Community College allows students to take college classes on the MHBS campus.  This is possible because MHBS offers a block schedule that mimics college schedules and allows time for juniors and seniors to take college classes while still in high school.  MHBS also offers the Early-Scholar Program which allows students to take courses at the University of North Alabama during the day.  The timing of the block schedule and the close proximity to the UNA campus allows students the time to commute.  The school also conducts ACT preparation for their high school students.

A strong spiritual emphasis is placed on academics with daily Bible class being part of the mandatory course load for all students.  Daily chapel attendance is also required to begin each day where the students sing worship songs, read scripture and hear short devotional talks.  Corresponding with the strict biblical literalism of the Church of Christ, students at MHBS are taught that the Earth is between 6,000 and 8,000 years old and that Charles Darwin's theory of evolution by natural selection is a myth.

Athletics
Mars Hill competes in the Alabama High School Athletic Association in the 2A classification.  Their nickname is the "Panthers".  The school has won 18 Alabama High School Athletic Association championships, with five in baseball (including 1977, 1978, 2010, 2012 and 2019), seven in girls' basketball, one in boys' golf, two in girls' track and field, one in girls' softball, and two in football.  The Panthers' Football program began in 2009 and was built into a Varsity program over the period of a couple of years. On August 21, 2014 Mars Hill played their first varsity football game against the Sheffield Bulldogs.  After making their way into the 2A Playoffs in the 2017-18 season, the Panthers defeated the Linden Patriots at Jordan-Hare Stadium to claim its first state championship in Football.  

Men's sports
Football
Baseball
Basketball
Cross country
Forensics Squad
Golf
Soccer
Tennis
Track and field
Women's sports
Basketball
Cross country
Forensics Squad
Golf
Soccer
Softball
Tennis
Track and field
Volleyball

Notable alumni

References

External links
 Private School Review
 National Forensic League

Christian schools in Alabama
Preparatory schools in Alabama
Schools in Florence, Alabama
Private elementary schools in Alabama
Private middle schools in Alabama
Private high schools in Alabama
Nondenominational Christian schools in the United States
Educational institutions established in 1871
1871 establishments in Alabama